Laser Love is the second album released by UK band After the Fire. Released in 1979, the album showcased more of a new wave approach, including much shorter songs than had been featured on the band's more progressive rock-oriented debut album, Signs of Change. The band's biggest hit in the UK, "One Rule For You" is featured on this album.

Track listing

Side one
"Laser Love" (Andy Piercy, Peter "Memory" Banks)  (3:28)
"Joy" (Banks, Piercy, John Russell, Ivor Twiddell)  (3:17)
"Take Me Higher" (Piercy, Banks)  (4:31)
"Life in the City" (Piercy, Banks)  (4:13)
"Suspended Animation" (Piercy, Banks) (4:52)

Side two
"Like the Power of a Jet" (Piercy, Banks) (3:07)
"One Rule For You" (Piercy, Banks) (3:24)
"Time to Think" (Piercy, Banks) (3:28)
"Timestar" (Banks)  (4:36)
"Check It Out" (Piercy, Banks)  (3:21)

References

External links
 http://www.afterthefire.co.uk/original/discography.htm

After the Fire albums
1979 albums
Albums produced by Rupert Hine
Albums produced by John Leckie
Albums produced by Muff Winwood
Albums produced by Rhett Davies
CBS Records albums